The 1972 Pacific Southwest Open – Men's singles was an event of the 1972 Pacific Southwest Open tennis tournament and was played on outdoor hard courts at the Los Angeles Tennis Center in Los Angeles, California in the United States between September 18 and September 24, 1970. The draw comprised 64 players of which 16 were seeded. Eight players qualified via a 64-man qualifying and a 203-man pre-qualifying event. Pancho Gonzales  was the defending Pacific Southwest Open champion but was defeated in the quarterfinals. Third-seeded Stan Smith won the title by defeating 13th-seeded Roscoe Tanner in the final, 6–4, 6–4.

Seeds

Draw

Finals

Top half

Section 1

Section 2

Bottom half

Section 3

Section 4

References

Los Angeles Open (tennis)
Pacific Southwest Open
Pacific Southwest Open